Sartang-e Ravaq (also Romanized as Sartang-e Ravāq) is a village in Pataveh Rural District, Pataveh District, Dana County, Kohgiluyeh and Boyer-Ahmad Province, Iran. At the 2006 census, its population was 103, in 21 families.

References 

Populated places in Dana County